75011 may refer to:

Postal codes
 11th arrondissement of Paris, France
 Accettura, Basilicate, Italy 
 Carrollton, Texas, United States
 Šilalė, Tauragė, Lithuania

Other
 75011, a minor planet without naming citation

See also
For the year, see Timeline of the far future